ACET may refer to:
 ACET (AIDS charity)
 the Centre for Advanced Computing and Emerging Technologies (ACET) at University of Reading